Sirthenea carinata is a species of corsair in the family Reduviidae. It is found in Central America, North America, and South America.

References

Further reading

External links

 

Reduviidae
Articles created by Qbugbot
Insects described in 1798